Clann Mhuirich may refer to:

Clan Macpherson, a Scottish clan historically centred in Badenoch
MacMhuirich bardic family, also known as Clann MacMhuirich, a family of bards to the MacDonalds centred in the Hebrides

See also
MacMhuirich (disambiguation)